Cedar Creek and Belle Grove National Historical Park became the 388th unit of the United States National Park Service when it was authorized on December 19, 2002. The National Historical Park was created to protect several historically significant locations in the Shenandoah Valley of Northern Virginia, notably the site of the American Civil War Battle of Cedar Creek and the Belle Grove Plantation.

Although there are over 3,700 acres within the park's authorized boundary, over half of this is still privately owned. Much of the battlefield is not accessible to the public, but the park offers ranger-led and self-guided driving tours of the battlefield via public roads. Nearly all of the remaining land (approximately 1,500 acres) and buildings are preserved and administered by partner sites which predate the park.  Since summer 2010, the park has offered interpretive ranger programs at key partner sites, including Cedar Creek Battlefield Foundation headquarters, Belle Grove Plantation, and Hupp's Hill Civil War Park. The American Battlefield Trust and its federal, state and local partners have acquired and preserved  of the battlefield through November 2021, some of which has been acquired by the National Park Service and incorporated into the park.

In 2012, the park acquired land on which sits a monument to the 8th Vermont Infantry and now offers access through semi-regular programs at the site. In March 2013, the park opened a Visitor Contact Station in Middletown, Virginia, featuring interpretive exhibits and information on how visitors can experience the park.

The Cedar Creek Battlefield and Belle Grove is also a U.S. National Historic Landmark. and the  "Cedar Creek Battlefield and Belle Grove" is listed on the National Register of Historic Places.

The plantation house of Belle Grove (1797) is open to the public and operates independently as part of the National Trust for Historic Preservation.

The listed area is in Frederick County and Warren County.

See also
List of National Historic Landmarks in Virginia
National Register of Historic Places listings in Frederick County, Virginia
National Register of Historic Places listings in Warren County, Virginia

References

External links

Cedar Creek & Belle Grove National Historical Park, National Park Service website
Cedar Creek Battlefield Foundation
Belle Grove, Middletown, Virginia's, official website

National Historical Parks of the United States
National Park Service areas in Virginia
American Civil War museums in Virginia
Battlefields of the Eastern Theater of the American Civil War
Historic house museums in Virginia
Museums in Frederick County, Virginia
Parks in Frederick County, Virginia
Parks in Shenandoah County, Virginia
Parks in Warren County, Virginia
National Historic Landmarks in Virginia
National Register of Historic Places in Warren County, Virginia
National Register of Historic Places in Frederick County, Virginia
2002 establishments in Virginia
Protected areas established in 2002
Federal architecture in Virginia
Georgian architecture in Virginia
Neoclassical architecture in Virginia
Palladian Revival architecture in Virginia
Historic districts on the National Register of Historic Places in Virginia
Conflict sites on the National Register of Historic Places in Virginia
American Civil War on the National Register of Historic Places
Houses on the National Register of Historic Places in Virginia
Parks on the National Register of Historic Places in Virginia